The Douglas C-132 was an American military transport aircraft proposed in the 1950s by the Douglas Aircraft Company, based on the company's C-124 Globemaster II. The C-132 would have been the largest aircraft of its era.

Development
In January 1951, the United States Air Force (USAF) issued a request for a preliminary design of a heavy cargo transport aircraft. The aircraft needed the ability to transport  of payload . By December 1952, the USAF selected a proposal from the Douglas Aircraft Company, which would serve as a cargo transport and as an air-to-air refueling tanker. The Douglas design was given the designation of C-132 by April 1953, and a mockup of the C-132 was built in February 1954. Douglas announced in December 1954 that the C-132 would be powered by the Pratt & Whitney T57 engine, a new turboprop in the  class. The T57 would be flight tested on a Douglas C-124 Globemaster II testbed aircraft. The USAF expected the T57 engine to be flown experimentally within two years, and it hoped the engine would be operational within five years.

The next month, the USAF confirmed that the C-132 was the aircraft with that capability, which meant the C-132 would have more payload capacity than three Douglas C-124Bs, then the largest cargo transport aircraft. In November 1955, the USAF announced that the mockup would be moved from Douglas's main Santa Monica, California factory to its Tulsa, Oklahoma plant, where production of the C-132 would occur if a production contract was awarded. The mockup was set up in the Tulsa factory by January 1956. While the move was being made, flight testing of the T57 engine was planned for early 1956, but the engine did not fly until early autumn of 1956. In its May 1956 congressional testimony, the USAF praised the C-132 tankering capabilities, including its large capacity, low cargo costs per ton-mile, and ability to fly at high altitudes, but it then canceled the tanker version of the aircraft in mid-1956.

First flight was originally planned for April 1957, but the target slipped to mid-1959. The USAF had planned to buy 30 aircraft, and they would be delivered at an annual rate of six aircraft, beginning in early 1961.

The news release, which was carried widely in American mass-circulation newspapers and magazines, also had photographs of the C-132 mockup in Tulsa. However, the USAF retracted its statement five days later, saying that it only had a development contract with Douglas to build two C-132 prototypes, and that it was considering the termination of the project. The unauthorized news release embarrassed the USAF, since the upcoming fiscal 1958 defense budget contained almost no money for new transport aircraft. In its retraction, the USAF did not mention that on December 31, 1956, it had already sent a report to the United States Congress, informing them of its decision to remove the C-132 from its aircraft program.

The project was officially cancelled on March 20, 1957, after $104 million had been allocated and $70 million of non-recoverable costs had been spent on the program. Oklahoma's congressional delegation pushed back against the cancellation, and Douglas publicly campaigned for C-132 funding restoration to improve the nation's airlift capability and allow for long-range transport of intercontinental ballistic missiles. Douglas also denied rumors that problems with the development of the engine caused the cancellation. Douglas did not respond to assertions that budget restrictions and increasing requirements from the Strategic Air Command were responsible, although in June 1956, a former USAF research and development official testified to the United States Senate that C-132 program initiation was withheld for two years, even after they had determined that the engine development risk was manageable enough to support the program's go-ahead. However, the project was not revived. No prototype was built, and the project did not get past the mockup stage.

Design
The C-132 was to be powered by four  Pratt & Whitney T57 turboprops, mounted on a swept wing. The T57 was to be the most powerful turboprop engine in existence at the time. It also would have used the largest propeller at the time, the  Hamilton Standard B48P6A propeller. The T57 turboprops provided  of residual jet thrust. The XKC-132 air refueling version would only have utilized the probe and drogue (P&D) air refueling system. That system, used primarily by the US Navy, did not find favor with the USAF.

The aircraft had a dual wheel nose landing gear, while the main landing gear had 16 wheels arranged in two coaxial quadruple wheel units that operate in tandem under each side of the fuselage.

Specifications (C-132)

See also

References

Bibliography

External links

 
 

C-132
Cancelled military aircraft projects of the United States
Four-engined tractor aircraft
High-wing aircraft
Four-engined turboprop aircraft